The 2020 West Sumatra gubernatorial election was held on 9 December 2020 in West Sumatra, Indonesia, as part of the simultaneous local elections. This election was held by the West Sumatra Regional General Elections Commission (KPU), to elect the Governor of West Sumatra along with his deputy to a 2021–2024 mandate.

The incumbent Governor Irwan Prayitno was ineligible to run for a third term as he has already served two terms after winning the election in 2010 and being re-elected in 2015. The elected governor and deputy governor were inaugurated on 25 February 2021 by President Joko Widodo.

Seats at the DPRD 
There are 9 political parties that gained seats at the West Sumatra Regional People's Representative Council (DPRD) in the 2019 legislative election.

Candidates

Debates 
There were two gubernatorial debates, both of which were attended by the four candidates for governor and deputy governor.

Controversy 
On 2 September 2020, while submitting a letter of recommendation to the candidate pair of Mulyadi–Ali Mukhni from her party, in support of them, the Chairwoman of the Central Board of the Indonesian Democratic Party of Struggle (PDIP), Puan Maharani, made a remark that offended West Sumatra public at large, as she hopes that West Sumatra "could become a province that does support a Pancasila state". Another controversial statement was also made by the General Chairwoman of the PDIP, Megawati Sukarnoputri, who questioned West Sumatra people in general who disliked her party. Because of such controversial statements that deemed offending West Sumatra citizens, Mulyadi–Ali Mukhni eventually returned the letter of recommendation from the party, leaving the PDIP not participating in this election.

On 5 December 2020, Mulyadi was named suspect by the Criminal Investigation Agency for allegedly violating campaigning rules. However, the case was stopped on 13 December 2020, and he was acquitted from all charges since.

Opinion polls

Results

Summary 

|-  style="background:#e9e9e9; text-align:center;"
! colspan="2" style="text-align:left;"| Candidate
! style="text-align:left;"| Running mate
! style="text-align:left;"| Parties
! style="width:75px;"| Votes
! style="width:30px;"| %
|-
| style="background-color:" |
| style="text-align:left;"| Mulyadi
| style="text-align:left;"| Ali Mukhni
| style="text-align:left;"| Democratic Party
| 
| 
|-
| style="background-color:" |
| style="text-align:left;"| Nasrul Abit
| style="text-align:left;"| Indra Catri
| style="text-align:left;"| Great Indonesia Movement Party
| 
| 
|-
| style="background-color:" |
| style="text-align:left;"| Fakhrizal
| style="text-align:left;"| Genius Umar
| style="text-align:left;"| Independent
| 
| 
|-
| style="background-color:" |
| style="text-align:left;"| Mahyeldi Ansharullah
| style="text-align:left;"| Audy Joinaldy
| style="text-align:left;"| Prosperous Justice Party
| 
| 
|-
| colspan="6" style="background:#e9e9e9;"|
|-
! colspan="4" style="text-align:left;"| Total
! 
! 100.00
|-
| colspan="6" style="background:#e9e9e9;"| 
|-
| colspan="4" style="text-align:left;"| Valid votes
|  || 
|-
| colspan="4" style="text-align:left;"| Invalid/blank votes
|  || 
|-
| colspan="4" style="text-align:left;"| Turnout
|  || 
|-
| colspan="4" style="text-align:left;"| Abstentions
|  || 
|-
| colspan="4" style="text-align:left;"| Registered voters
| 
| style="background:#e9e9e9;"|
|-
| colspan="6" style="background:#e9e9e9;"| 
|-
| colspan="6" style="text-align:left;"| Source: West Sumatra Regional General Elections Commission
|}

Details

See also 
 2020 Indonesian local elections

References

External links 
 West Sumatra Province Regional Government
 West Sumatra Regional General Elections Commission

2020 Indonesian local elections
2020 Indonesian gubernatorial elections
West Sumatra
Politics of West Sumatra